Poets Corner Group is a poetry group in India. The group's main purpose is to make it easier for new and aspiring poets to be published. Since its advent, Poets Corner has published over 340 poets in 21 anthologies in both English and Hindi language.

The Poets Corner Group also hosts online competitions, poetry reading events, panel discussion, book launches, workshops, and other activities.

History 
Poets Corner was co-founded by Yaseen Anwer and Dolly Singh.

Delhi Poetry Festival 

Delhi Poetry Festival is an annual poetry event organized by Poets Corner in Delhi, first held on 19 January 2013.

2013 Edition

The 2013 festival participants included:

 Irshad Kamil 
 Abhishek Manu Singhvi 
 Ashok Sawhny

2014 Edition
The 2014 festival participants included:

 Sandeep Nath 
 Janice Woods Windle

Published work 
The Poets Corner Group has published several poetry anthologies featuring young poets along with established poets including A. P. J. Abdul Kalam, Gulzar, Ruskin Bond, Nida Fazli, Vikram Seth, Irshad Kamil, Shashi Tharoor, Ravish Kumar, Deepti Naval, Shekhar Kapur, and Rahat Indori.

Books & anthologies 

Inklinks

Gestures: Miscalculated Poetries by Misunderstood Poets

Aks: Tere Mere Khalayon Ka

Bikhri Os Ki Boondain

Love simply and other poem (By Payal Pasha)

Inks (By Neha R. Krishna)

Khalaayen (By Aseem Ahmed Abbasee)

Think Poetry, Think Haiku (By Ashok Sawhny)

Lamhey
	
Oncemortal (By Nikhil Sharma)

Silent Flute (By Aparna Pathak)

Ehsaas (By Dr. Tina Gulzar)

See also 
 Delhi Poetry Festival
 Manipuri Sahitya Parishad
 Sahitya Akademi

References

External links 
 
 Official website of DPF
 The Economic Times
 Bangalore Mirror 
 The Hindu
 CNN-IBN
 Hindustan Times

Poetry organizations
Arts organisations based in Delhi
Arts organizations established in 2011
Indian writers' organisations